Jacob Kinzer Shell (February 14, 1862 — December 10, 1940) was an American college football player and coach. He served as the head football coach at Swarthmore College form 1888 to 1898, compiling a record of 58–40–4.  Shell was the athletic director at the University of Illinois at Urbana–Champaign from 1888 to 1901.  He  was also a founder of the Amateur Athletic Union (AAU).  Shell died on December 10, 1940, in Philadelphia.

Head coaching record

References

External links
 Sports-Reference profile
 

1862 births
1940 deaths
19th-century players of American football
Illinois Fighting Illini athletic directors
Illinois Fighting Illini football coaches
Swarthmore Garnet Tide football coaches
Penn Quakers football players
Sportspeople from Harrisburg, Pennsylvania
Players of American football from Harrisburg, Pennsylvania